Florimond is a given name. Notable people with the name include:

Florimond Cornellie
Florimond de Beaune
Joseph Florimond Loubat
Count Claude Florimond de Mercy
Florimond Claude, Comte de Mercy-Argenteau
Florimond Ronger
Prince Florimund, character in some versions of "Sleeping Beauty"

French masculine given names